La Haute-Gaspésie is a regional county municipality in the Gaspésie–Îles-de-la-Madeleine region of eastern Quebec, Canada, on the Gaspé peninsula. The regional county municipality seat is in Sainte-Anne-des-Monts.

Prior to May 27, 2000, it was known as Denis-Riverin Regional County Municipality.

Subdivisions
There are 10 subdivisions within the RCM:

Cities & Towns (2)
 Cap-Chat
 Sainte-Anne-des-Monts

Municipalities (4)
 La Martre
 Rivière-à-Claude
 Sainte-Madeleine-de-la-Rivière-Madeleine
 Saint-Maxime-du-Mont-Louis

Villages (2)
 Marsoui
 Mont-Saint-Pierre

Unorganized Territory (2)
 Coulée-des-Adolphe
 Mont-Albert

Demographics

Population

Language

Transportation

Access Routes

Highways and numbered routes that run through the municipality, including external routes that start or finish at the county border:

Autoroutes
None

Principal Highways

Secondary Highways

External Routes
None

See also

 List of regional county municipalities and equivalent territories in Quebec

References

Regional county municipalities in Gaspésie–Îles-de-la-Madeleine
Census divisions of Quebec